Preis der Literaturhäuser is a German literary prize. Since 2002, it has been awarded to German authors annually by the Netzwerk der Literaturhäuser during the Leipziger Buchmesse for exceptional text and presentation skills. The prize contains a journey through the eleven Literaturhäuser in Germany with a cost of €11,000 (about $12,393 US) as well as a eulogy in honor of the author in all eleven Literaturhäuser.

Award winners

 2002 Ulrike Draesner
 2003 Bodo Hell 
 2004 Peter Kurzeck 
 2005 Michael Lentz
 2006  
 2007 Sibylle Lewitscharoff
 2008 
 2009 Ilija Trojanow
 2010 Thomas Kapielski
 2011 Elke Erb
 2012 Feridun Zaimoglu
 2013 Hanns Zischler
 2014 Judith Schalansky
 2015 Nicolas Mahler
 2016 Ulf Stolterfoht
 2017 Terézia Mora
 2018 Jaroslav Rudiš
 2019 Antje Rávic Strubel
 2020 Marlene Streeruwitz
 2021 Ingo Schulze

References

External links
 

German literary awards